Lion Semić (born 13 September 2003) is a German footballer who plays as a right-back for Borussia Dortmund II.

Club career

Early life
Born in Fritzlar, Germany, Semić started playing football at the age of five with FSG Gudensberg. He joined Borussia Dortmund in 2017 from KSV Baunatal.

International career
Semić has represented Germany at numerous youth levels. He is also eligible to represent Bosnia and Herzegovina.

Career statistics

Club

References

External links
 

2003 births
German people of Bosnia and Herzegovina descent
People from Fritzlar
Sportspeople from Kassel (region)
Footballers from Hesse
Living people
German footballers
Germany youth international footballers
Association football defenders
Borussia Dortmund players
Borussia Dortmund II players
Bundesliga players
3. Liga players